ADAM 17 endopeptidase (tumor necrosis factor alpha-converting enzyme, TACE) is an enzyme. This enzyme catalyses the following chemical reaction

 Narrow endopeptidase specificity. Cleaves Pro-Leu-Ala-Gln-Ala-Val-Arg-Ser-Ser-Ser in the membrane-bound, 26-kDa form of tumor necrosis factor alpha (TNFalpha). Similarly cleaves other membrane-anchored, cell-surface proteins to "shed" the extracellular domains

This enzyme belongs to the peptidase family M12.

References

External links 
 

EC 3.4.24